Tuppadakurahatti is a village in Dharwad district of Karnataka, India.

Demographics 
As of the 2011 Census of India there were 609 households in Tuppadakurahatti and a total population of 2,877 consisting of 1,454 males and 1,423 females. There were 345 children ages 0-6.

References

Villages in Dharwad district